Josip Kvesić (born 21 September 1990) is a Bosnian professional footballer who plays as a left-back for Croatian First Football League club HNK Šibenik.

Honours
Željezničar
Bosnian Premier League: 2011–12, 2012–13
Bosnian Cup: 2011–12

References

External links
Josip Kvesić at Sofascore

1990 births
Living people
Bosnia and Herzegovina footballers
People from Široki Brijeg
Croats of Bosnia and Herzegovina
Association football fullbacks
Bosnia and Herzegovina youth international footballers
Bosnia and Herzegovina under-21 international footballers
MŠK Žilina players
NK Varaždin players
FK Željezničar Sarajevo players
Antalyaspor footballers
Karşıyaka S.K. footballers
HNK Hajduk Split players
Anorthosis Famagusta F.C. players
NK Široki Brijeg players
HNK Šibenik players
Slovak Super Liga players
Croatian Football League players
Premier League of Bosnia and Herzegovina players
Süper Lig players
TFF First League players
Cypriot First Division players
Bosnia and Herzegovina expatriate footballers
Bosnia and Herzegovina expatriate sportspeople in Slovakia
Bosnia and Herzegovina expatriate sportspeople in Turkey
Bosnia and Herzegovina expatriate sportspeople in Croatia
Bosnia and Herzegovina expatriate sportspeople in Cyprus
Expatriate footballers in Slovakia
Expatriate footballers in Turkey
Expatriate footballers in Croatia
Expatriate footballers in Cyprus